Photinia raupingensis is a species in the family Rosaceae of flowering plants.

References

raupingensis